José Ramalho may refer to:
José Ramalho (rower) (1901–?), Brazilian rower
José Mauro Ramalho (1925–2019), Brazilian bishop
José Ramalho (volleyball) (born 1937), Brazilian volleyball player
José Luiz Aguiar e Ramalho (born 1964), Brazilian handball players